"Straight to You" is a song by Nick Cave and the Bad Seeds appearing on their 1992 album Henry's Dream. It was released as a single in 1992 by Mute Records. It charted at no. 68 in the UK and no. 96 in Australia. It gained both contemporary and retrospective critical acclaim.

Critical reception
Upon its release, Simon Price of Melody Maker picked "Straight to You" as the magazine's "single of the week". He described the song as "a deliverance hymn" and "a desperate plea for refuge in the face of global catastrophe". He added, "Cave 'oversings' every word (of course), transcending the thin line between stylised Las Vegas camp and absolute sincerity, while The Bad Seeds use C&W mannerisms to create a mood that is pure Gospel."

Accolades

Formats and track listing 
All songs written by Nick Cave.
UK 7" single (MUTE 140)
 "Straight to You" – 4:34
 "Jack the Ripper" – 2:47

UK CD single (CD MUTE 140), 12" single (12 MUTE 140)
 "Straight to You" – 4:34
 "Jack the Ripper" – 3:44
 "Blue Bird" – 2:46

Personnel
Adapted from the Straight to You liner notes.

Nick Cave and The Bad Seeds
Blixa Bargeld – guitar, backing vocals
Martyn P. Casey – bass guitar, backing vocals
Nick Cave – lead vocals, mixing
Mick Harvey – guitar, piano, organ, drums, mixing
Thomas Wydler – percussion

Production and additional personnel
 David Briggs – production
 Tony Cohen – engineering, mixing
 Anton Corbijn – photography, art direction
 Chuck Johnson – engineering

Charts

Release history

References

External links 
 

1992 songs
1992 singles
Nick Cave songs
Songs written by Nick Cave
Elektra Records singles
Mute Records singles
Song recordings produced by David Briggs (record producer)